Alby is a locality situated in Ånge Municipality, Västernorrland County, Sweden with 367 inhabitants in 2010.

References 

Populated places in Ånge Municipality
Medelpad